Solomon Hughes may refer to:

 Solomon Hughes (journalist), British journalist and author
 Solomon Hughes (actor), American actor and basketball player